North High School (commonly North, North High, or NHS) is a public high school located in Sioux City, Iowa with an enrollment of approximately 1,500 students. The school is a part of the Sioux City School District and is one of three public high schools in Sioux City.

The school mascot is Stars, and their colors are red and blue.

Athletics 
The Stars compete in the Missouri River Conference in the following sports:

Baseball 
 2009 Class 4A State Champions
Basketball
 Girls' 2-time Class 4A State Champions (2007, 2009)   
Bowling
Cross Country 
Football
Golf 
Soccer 
Softball 
Swimming 
Tennis
Track and Field 
Volleyball 
 1982 Class 2A State Champions
Wrestling

Jacqui Kalin led the school basketball team to a Class 4A Iowa State Championship in 2007. She holds the school records for assists in a season (146) and career (324), and for free throws in a career (245), and holds the school and city record in the 400-meter hurdles.

Bus service 
The school is serviced by Sioux City Transit, which is open to all fare-paying passengers Monday to Friday during the school year.

Notable alumni
 John Arnaud, safety for Michigan Panthers (USFL)
Brittni Donaldson, current assistant coach of the Toronto Raptors
 Jacqui Kalin (born 1989), American-Israeli professional basketball player
Ted Waitt, co-founder of Gateway Computers
 Daniel Tillo, pitcher in the Kansas City Royals organization
 Matt Chatham, former Linebacker for New England Patriots and New York Jets
 Lori Petty, American actress and director, noted for her roles in the films Point Break (1991), A League of Their Own (1992), Free Willy (1993).
 Steve Warnstadt, former Iowa state senator.

See also
List of high schools in Iowa

References

External links 
 

Public high schools in Iowa
Schools in Sioux City, Iowa
1972 establishments in Iowa
Educational institutions established in 1972